R.M.K. College of Engineering and Technology (RMKCET) is an engineering college in the village of Puduvoyal, in the municipality of Thiruvallur, in the Indian state of Tamil Nadu. It is governed by the Lakshmikanthammal Educational Trust, affiliated with Anna University, Chennai, and approved by AICTE. It is a Telugu minority institution. It is accredited by NAAC with A grade. It is also ISO 9000-2015 certified institution.

The college opened in 2008 with four departments: Computer Science and Engineering (CSE), Electrical and Electronics Engineering (EEE), Electronics and Communication Engineering (ECE), Mechanical Engineering (MECH).It now has more than 1700 students in various departments such as EEE, ECE, CSE, and mechanical engineering. The college has a fleet of 3 buses for transportation of students covering all most Chennai and Tiruvallur dist.

Courses offered

B.E. in Computer Science and Engineering
B.E. in Electrical and Electronics Engineering
B.E. in Electronics and Communication Engineering
B.E. in Mechanical Engineering

The campus is located at Puduvoyal village at a distance of about 330 km from Chennai on the Chennai-Vijayawada National Highway. It is easily reachable from Chennai by buses proceeding to Gummidipoondi/Sulurpet/Nellore/Naidupeta/Sri Kalahasthi/Tirupati. The suburban trains between Chennai and Gummidipoondi stop at Kavaraipettai station and from there the college is 3km away.

The institute has a huge complex that houses class rooms, air conditioned seminar halls, central library, departmental libraries and Internet with 2Kbit/s connectivity. There are separate hostels for men and women.

RMK Group of Institutions 
 RMK Engineering College
 RMD Engineering College
 RMK College of Engineering and Technology
 RMK Matriculation School
 Sri Durga Devi Polytechnic
 RMK Residential School

References

External links
 RMK Engineering College Official Site

Engineering colleges in Tamil Nadu
Colleges affiliated to Anna University
Education in Tiruvallur district
Educational institutions established in 2008
2008 establishments in Tamil Nadu